"Foxy Lady" is the name of a popular song originally recorded by Jimi Hendrix.

Foxy Lady may also refer to:
Foxy Lady (Cher album) (1972)
Foxy Lady (RuPaul album) (1996)
Foxy Lady (Harisu album) (2004)
Foxy Lady (Hang on the Box album) (2004)
Foxy Lady (film), a 1971 film by Ivan Reitman
Foxy Lady (TV series), a 1982-84 ITV TV Series
"Fox-y Lady", a 2009 episode of Family Guy
Foxy Lady (manga), a 2002 fantasy manga
Foxy Lady, a sailboat captured by the Khmer Rouge on 13 August 1978